Theodore "Ted" G. Brown (born December 1, 1927) is an American cool jazz tenor saxophonist. Brown has worked with Warne Marsh and Ronnie Ball, and recorded with Lennie Tristano, Art Pepper, Hod O'Brien and Lee Konitz, as well as heading his own groups.

Discography

As leader and co-leader
 1956: Free Wheeling (Vanguard)
 1985: In Good Company with Jimmy Raney (Criss Cross)
 1989: Free Spirit (Criss Cross)
 1999: Dig-It with Lee Konitz (SteepleChase) 
 2002: Preservation (SteepleChase)
 2006: Complete Free Wheeling Sessions with Art Pepper (compilation album)
 2007: Shades of Brown
 2009: Live at Pit Inn (Marshmallow)
 2012: Two of a Kind with Brad Linde (Bleebop)
 2012: Pound Cake with Kirk Knuffke (Steeplechase)
 2018: All About Lennie with Brad Linde (Bleebop Records)
 2018: Jazz Of New Cities with Brad Linde (Bleebop Records)
 2020: Drifting On A Reed with Brad Linde (Bleebop Records)

As sideman
With Lee Konitz
 Lee Konitz Meets Jimmy Giuffre (Verve, 1959) with Jimmy Giuffre
 Figure and Spirit (1976)
Sound of Surprise (RCA Victor, 1999)
With Warne Marsh
 Jazz of Two Cities (Imperial, 1956)
With Lennie Tristano
 Intuition (1996)

References 

1927 births
Living people
Cool jazz saxophonists
American male saxophonists
Musicians from Rochester, New York
21st-century American saxophonists
21st-century American male musicians
American male jazz musicians